Elizabeth Ann Winzeler is an American microbiologist and geneticist. She is a professor in the Division of Host-Microbe Systems and Therapeutics of the School of Medicine at the University of California at San Diego. Although she works in a variety of different disease areas, most research focuses on developing better medicines for the treatment and eradication of malaria.

Early life and education 
Dr. Winzeler is the daughter of American Anthropologist, Dr. Robert L. Winzeler .  She grew up in Reno, Nevada, and attended Lewis and Clark College in Portland, Oregon. She received her B.A. in Natural Sciences and Art in 1984. After college, she worked as a professional programmer and systems analyst for four years before moving to Oregon State University in Corvallis, Oregon to earn a M.S. in Biophysics and Biochemistry.  In 1996, she was awarded a Ph.D. from Stanford University in Developmental Biology for her studies on Caulobacter crescentus with Lucy Shapiro.  She stayed at Stanford for postdoctoral work with Ronald W. Davis, joining a long academic family tree (https://academictree.org/chemistry).  At Stanford she played a leading role in developing seminal post-genome analysis methods in Saccharomyces cerevisiae.

Career 
In 1999, Winzeler was recruited by Peter G. Schultz to the newly-established Genomics Institute of the Novartis Research Foundation.  In 2000, she obtained a secondary position as an assistant professor in the Department of Cell Biology at Scripps Research.  In 2012, she moved to the University of California, San Diego where she is currently a professor in the Department of Pediatrics and director of Translational Research at the UCSD Health Sciences Center for Immunity, Infection, and Inflammation.  She is a member of the Division of Host Microbe Systems and Therapeutics and the Institute for Genomic Medicine.

Research 
While she was still at Stanford University, she began working at the interface of genetics and informatics in the new field of functional genomics. After establishing her own lab, she began applying the powerful, high throughput methods that worked well in yeast to organisms that were both more medically-relevant and experimentally-challenging, namely the protozoan Plasmodium parasites that cause human malaria. She showed that malaria parasites produce coordinated sets of gene messages as they progress through their complex lifecycle and developed methods for studying parasite genetic variation and genome evolution especially in relationship to the emergence of drug resistance. She is also known for developing phenotypic screening methods as well as contributions to drug development and Open Source Drug Discovery.  Her group has developed screening methods that have led to the discovery of several new antimalarial chemotypes, two of which have been developed into clinical candidates.  These include Ganaplacide (KAF156) and Cipargamin (KAE609).  In addition, her lab discovered the targets of a variety of antimalarial compounds, including PfATP4, and Pf1-phosphatidylinositol 4-kinase. In 2017 she became director of the Bill and Melinda Gates Foundation Malaria Drug Accelerator (MALDA), an international consortium that seeks to develop better treatments for malaria. She is a member of the governing board of the Tres Cantos Open Lab Foundation.

Awards and honors 
 Ellison Medical Foundation New Scholar in Global Infectious Disease 2001
 W. M. Keck Foundation New Scholar Award 2004
 Howard T. Ricketts Symposium Lecture 2013
 Bailey K. Ashford Medal American Society of Tropical Medicine and Hygiene (ASTMH) 2014
 Fellow, American Academy of Microbiology 2016
 Medicines for Malaria Venture Project of the Year 2017
 Alice and C. C. Wang in Molecular Parasitology 2018
 William Trager Award on behalf of ASTMH and the American Committee of Molecular, Cellular and Immunoparasitology 2018
 Ruth Sonntag Nussenzweig Memorial Symposium 2019
 United Arab Emirates Crown Prince, Reaching the Last Mile Finalist 2019
 Rady Children's Hospital Awards of Excellence in Basic Research 2020
 UCSD Health Science Women Leadership Award 2020
 Elected to the National Academy of Medicine  2021

References

External links 
 

Living people
Stanford University alumni
Lewis & Clark College alumni
Oregon State University alumni
American women scientists
University of California, San Diego faculty
American microbiologists
American geneticists
Malariologists
1962 births
21st-century scientists
Members of the National Academy of Medicine
21st-century American women